Powersurge is a Bangladeshi thrash metal band formed in Dhaka, Bangladesh, in 2006. They are one of the pioneering thrash metal bands in the country, and is part of the "East Bengal extreme metal scene". The group came to public attention in 2007, after becoming the winner of D-Rockstar II, a rock and metal hunt talent show.

The original lineup consists of vocalist Jamshed Chowdhury, lead guitarist Samir Hafiz, rhythm guitarist Saimum Hasan, bassist Arefin Ahmed Saeed, and drummer Samiul Islam. In the mid-2006, they released their first single "Durboddho Monushotto" in a mixed album named Underground. In 2007, they participated in the rock and metal talent hunt show D-Rockstars II, where they became the winner. In August 2008, they released their first and only studio album "অপ্রস্তুত যুদ্ধ (Unprepared War)", which contained multiple hit songs like the self-titled song, "হাঙ্গর (Shark)", "মিথ্যের আগ্রাসন (False Aggression)", "Powersurge" and "শেষ সীমানা (End of Border)".

History

Formation and early years (2006-2007) 
Powersurge was formed in Dhaka in January 2006, by guitarist Saimum Hasan Nahian when he aligned with drummer Samiul Islam to form a thrash metal band. The band recruited Jamshed Chowdhury as lead singer, Samir Hafiz as lead guitarist, and Arefin Ahmed Saeed as bassist. The group were fans of the American thrash metal and German thrash metal bands like Metallica, Slayer, Megadeth, Exodus, Sepultura, Kreator and Sodom. They covered songs of those bands in the underground shows and gained popularity with their aggressive style of playing heavy metal music. They released their first single "দুর্বোধ্য মনুষত্ব (Rampant Humanity)" in the mixed album Underground in 2006. In 2007, they took part in the D-Rockstar II, where they became the winner by defeating other hard rock and heavy metal bands like Radioactive (second place) and Mechanix (third place).

"অপ্রস্তুত যুদ্ধ (Unprepared War)" (2007-2008) 

In June 2008, Powersurge went to Sound Garden Studio to record their first studio album "অপ্রস্তুত যুদ্ধ (Unprepared War)". It included several hit songs like "অপ্রস্তুত যুদ্ধ (Unprepared War)", "মিথ্যের আগ্রাসন (False Aggression)", "হাঙ্গর (Shark)", "শেষ সীমানা (End of Border)" and "Powersurge". The band rose to fame in the underground metal scene in Dhaka and became one of the leading bands in the "East Bengal extreme metal scene".

Discography

Studio albums 
 অপ্রস্তুত যুদ্ধ (Unprepared War) (2008)

Members

Present 
 Jamshed Chowdhury - lead vocals 
 Samir Hafiz - lead guitars 
 Saimum Hasan Nahian - rhythm guitars 
 Kawsar Ahmed Parvez - bass 
 Asif Mahmood - drums

Past 
 Shahriar Firoz Tonmoy - bass 
 Arefin Ahmed Saeed - bass 
 Samiul Islam - drums

References

External links 

 Metal Archives
 Official Facebook Page
 Official YouTube Channel
 ReverbNation

Bangladeshi heavy metal musical groups